The Understanding Heart is a 1927 American silent adventure drama film directed by Jack Conway and stars Joan Crawford in an early leading role. The film was adapted for the screen by Edward T. Lowe, Jr. from the novel of the same name by Peter B. Kyne.

Plot
Forest ranger Bob Mason kills a man in self-defense. Kelcey Dale, to whom Bob is attracted, commits perjury and causes him to be convicted for murder. Bob escapes and is sheltered by Kelcey's sister, Monica Dale.

Cast
Joan Crawford - Monica Dale
Rockliffe Fellowes - Bob Mason
Ralph Bushman - Tony Garland
Carmel Myers - Kelcey Dale
Richard Carle - Sheriff Bentley
Jerry Miley - Bardwell
Harvey Clark - Uncle Charlie

Preservation status
A print was preserved by the MGM Studios.

Production notes
The Understanding Heart features footage of fires used in the 1926 film The Fire Brigade.

References

External links

 

Lobby poster

1927 films
1920s adventure drama films
American adventure drama films
American silent feature films
American black-and-white films
Films based on American novels
Films directed by Jack Conway
Metro-Goldwyn-Mayer films
Surviving American silent films
1927 drama films
1920s American films
Silent American drama films
Silent adventure drama films
1920s English-language films